NGC 2281 is an open cluster of stars in the northern constellation of Auriga. It was discovered by English astronomer William Herschel on March 4, 1788 and described as a, "cluster of coarsely scattered pretty [bright] stars, pretty rich". The Trumpler class for NGC 2281 is I3p, indicating a poor (p) but compact (I) grouping with a wide range of brightness (3).

References

External links
 
 Image NGC 2281
 NGC 2281
 

NGC 2281
2281
Open clusters